NADH-Q6 oxidoreductase may refer to:

 NADH dehydrogenase, an enzyme
 NADH:ubiquinone reductase (non-electrogenic), an enzyme